From Hell to Heaven is a 1933 American pre-Code drama film. It was directed by Erle C. Kenton, and features an ensemble cast including Carole Lombard, Jack Oakie, Adrienne Ames and Sidney Blackmer. It was adapted from the stage play by Lawrence Hazard.

Synopsis
A group of people from several walks of life gather to watch a horse race.

Cast
 Carole Lombard as Colly Tanner
 Jack Oakie as Charlie Bayne
 Adrienne Ames as Joan Burt
 David Manners as Wesley Burt
 Sidney Blackmer as Cliff Billings
 Verna Hillie as Sonnie Lockwood
 James Eagles as Tommy Tucker
 Shirley Grey as Winnie Lloyd
 Bradley Page as Jack Ruby
 Walter Walker as Pop Lockwood
 Berton Churchill as Toledo Jones
 Cecil Cunningham as Mrs. Chadman
 Nydia Westman as Sue Wells

Production and reception
From Hell to Heaven was Paramount's effort to replicate the success of Grand Hotel (1932), which had won the Academy Award for Best Picture for MGM the year before. Reviews were favorable; Mordaunt Hall of The New York Times wrote, "It is not as ambitious a picture as Grand Hotel, but it is interesting."

References

External links

1933 films
1930s sports drama films
American black-and-white films
American sports drama films
Films directed by Erle C. Kenton
Films set in hotels
American horse racing films
Paramount Pictures films
Films with screenplays by Sidney Buchman
1933 drama films
1930s English-language films
1930s American films